"We're on the Road to D'ohwhere" is the eleventh episode of the seventeenth season of the American animated television series The Simpsons. It first aired on the Fox network in the United States on January 29, 2006.

Plot
While messing around in the school’s steam tunnels, Bart and Milhouse trigger a massive escape of steam that destroys the school. Although Milhouse is free to go, Principal Skinner proposes that Bart be sent off to "Upward Bound", a behavioral modification camp for troublemaking children based in Portland, Oregon. Meanwhile, Moe announces that he is treating Homer, Lenny, Carl and Barney with renting a minivan and taking them on a trip to Las Vegas, after a suicide attempt led to him suing the rope company that made a faulty noose and earning a hefty settlement. While the others pack their luggage and load it into the minivan near Moe's Tavern, Homer drives Bart to the airport to send him to the camp before going to Vegas. However, it is discovered that Bart is on the No Fly List after an incident in Atlanta where Bart unbuckled his seat belt before the plane could come to a complete stop.

Homer now has to drive Bart to the camp and is annoyed at having to miss the Vegas trip with his friends. While they are stopped at a roadside diner, Bart pretends to respect Homer in order to escape; his plan works and he heads off home. However, he then reluctantly rescues Homer from almost driving off a cliff and they are soon back on the road, now with Bart chained and duct-taped in his seat, Homer now unable to trust his son. Homer gets Bart to the camp, and leaves him there as Bart sadly watches Homer reluctantly drive away. As he drives to Vegas, Homer begins to feel guilty, and decides to bring Bart back. Meanwhile, Bart is thoroughly enjoying his stay at the camp, and begins to realize he does not have to feel good by doing pranks, until he sees Homer run down a horse with his car, and leaves with Homer to go to Vegas in return for washing the horse's blood off the car.

Meanwhile, Marge and Lisa have a yard sale, selling all of Homer and Bart's stuff with the intention of using the profits to buy knick-knacks and curios. It is initially a total failure until Otto discovers that Marge is selling the family's expired prescription drugs. Although reluctant, Marge soon makes much money selling prescription drugs, but Chief Wiggum eventually discovers the scheme and arrests her. Lisa returns home from school and gets two phone messages: one from Marge begging Homer for bail money and another from Homer, who made it to Vegas, but ended up in prison for fighting with a pit boss and losing track of Bart. Lisa tells Maggie that she anticipated the day when the two of them would be the only members of the family left to fend for themselves and states that she will look for work in the morning.

Reception
The original airing of the episode was watched by 9.04 million viewers.

References

External links
 Episode information at SimpsonsChannel.com
 

The Simpsons (season 17) episodes
2006 American television episodes